Wilfird Francis Doyle (first name often spelled Wilfred) (November 13, 1897 – January 16, 1988) was a politician in the state of Michigan.

Biography
Doyle was born in Green Bay, Wisconsin, on November 13, 1897. His father, Michael, served in the Michigan House of Representatives from 1891 to 1892. An older brother, Thurman, was a member of the Michigan Democratic State Central Committee. He died on January 16, 1988, at a nursing home in Wilton Manors, Florida and was buried in Mackinac Island, Michigan. Doyle was a Roman Catholic.

Career
Doyle was a member of the Michigan State Senate from 1933 to 1934. He was a newspaper reporter by trade. Doyle was the park commissioner for Mackinaw Island; he was on the commission from 1939 to 1985 and was nicknamed "King of Mackinac Island."

External links

The Political Graveyard

References

1897 births
1988 deaths
Politicians from Green Bay, Wisconsin
Catholics from Wisconsin
Catholics from Michigan
Catholics from Florida
Michigan state senators
20th-century American politicians
People from Wilton Manors, Florida
Burials in Michigan